Leading Edge Sports Car Company was a British car company based in Dereham, Norfolk established in June 2002. The company was dissolved in September 2005. It outsourced the manufacture of its cars to fellow Dereham company Breckland Technologies.

Leading Edge 190 RT

Leading Edge was established in 2002 by Paul Mickleburgh to market its first new car, the 190 and 240 RT in Europe and the US. The car was a lightly updated version of the Tommykaira ZZ, a popular car in Japan, but made in Norfolk, and it suffered from the Japanese recession and the company became bankrupt. The receivers sold the tooling and inventory to neighbouring Breckland Technology Ltd, run by ex-Lotus engineer Mark Easton, who continued to manufacture the cars and sold them on to Leading Edge to distribute from the summer of July 2002 at a price of around £26,500.

Top speed was claimed to reach  and accelerate 0-60 mph in 4.8 seconds. Its open-top body was glassfibre, with an extruded aluminium central tub topped and tailed by tubular metal subframes and weighed only .

Leading Edge 240 RT
The 240 RT was also launched in 2002 as a high-powered version of the previous Tommy Kaira ZZ. With the addition of a hard top roof in 2004, the weight increased to 809kg.

References

Sports car manufacturers
Defunct motor vehicle manufacturers of England
Car manufacturers of the United Kingdom
2002 establishments in England
British companies established in 2002
Vehicle manufacturing companies established in 2002
Companies based in Norfolk
Dereham